WCC may refer to:

Colleges

Community colleges
 Washtenaw Community College, near Ann Arbor, Michigan
 Waubonsee Community College, near Chicago, Illinois
 Wayne Community College, Goldsboro, North Carolina
 Westchester Community College, Valhalla, New York
 Whatcom Community College, Bellingham, Washington
 Windward Community College, Kāneohe, Hawaii
 Woodland Community College, Woodland, California

Other colleges
 Waverley Christian College, Melbourne, Australia
 West Cheshire College, vocational college in England
 Westminster Choir College, music conservatory in Princeton, New Jersey
 Women's Christian College, Chennai, Tamil Nadu, India
 William Clarke College, New South Wales, Australia
 Wyoming Catholic College, Lander, Wyoming

Sports
World Cycling Centre, a training facility for racing cyclists in Aigle, Switzerland
WCC Team, women's cycling team affiliated with the World Cycling Centre

Competitions
Western Canadian Championships, Gaelic Athletic Association tournaments, played in Canada
Western Canada Cup, ice hockey tournament for Canada's four western provinces
Wife-Carrying Championship
World Chess Championship
World Conker Championships
World Club Challenge, annual rugby league football competition
World Constructors' Championship, award for the most successful Formula One constructor in a season
World Curling Championship
World Cycling Championship
WWE Cruiserweight Championship (1991–2007), a professional wrestling title

Conferences
West Coast Conference, an NCAA collegiate athletic conference
Wisconsin Collegiate Conference

Companies
 West Coast Choppers, a company best known for selling chopper-style motorcycles
 West Coast Customs, a car remodeling company
 Western Cartridge Company, a manufacturer of small arms and ammunitions founded in 1898

Organizations

 White Citizens Council, a US campaigning group
 Westchester Country Club, a private golf club in Harrison, New York
 Women's Classical Caucus, a US academic classical feminist organization
 Women's Classical Committee UK, a UK academic classical feminist organization 
 World Children's Choir
 World Chlorine Council, an international network of national and regional Chloralkali process associations
 World Council of Churches, an international Christian ecumenical organization
 World Crafts Council
 Wiccan Church of Canada
 Women in Cinema Collective, an Indian organization for women in Malayalam cinema
 World Cat Congress
 Wolf Conservation Center

Politics and government
 Warwickshire County Council, England
 Wellington City Council, local government of Wellington City, New Zealand 
 Western Canada Concept, a Canadian political party
 Wiltshire County Council, England
 Worcestershire County Council, England
 Wolverhampton City Council, England
 World Climate Conference

Other meanings
 Wound Care Certified. Wound Care Nurse Certification; see list of nursing credentials
 Watcom C Compiler
 WCC (radio station), a ship-to-shore radio station originally in Chatham, Massachusetts
 Washington Conservation Corps, a subagency of the Washington State Department of Ecology
 Weak central coherence theory, a concept related to autism
 WebSphere Customer Center, IBM software product now branded as IBM InfoSphere MDM Server
 Weighted companion cube, an item/"character" from the computer game Portal
 White Cell Count
 Woodbury Country Club, a private golf club in Woodbury, New Jersey
 World Christian Conference, an annual conference that is held near Santa Cruz, California
 World Commerce Center, a commercial development near St. Augustine, Florida